Lindsay Ann Crouse is an American actress. She made her Broadway debut in the 1972 revival of Much Ado About Nothing and appeared in her first film in 1976 in All the President's Men. For her role in the 1984 film Places in the Heart, she received an Academy Award nomination for Best Supporting Actress. Her other films include Slap Shot (1977), Between the Lines (1977), The Verdict (1982), Prefontaine (1997), and The Insider (1999). She also had a leading role in the 1987 film House of Games, which was directed by her then-husband David Mamet. In 1996, she received a Daytime Emmy Award nomination for "Between Mother and Daughter", an episode of CBS Schoolbreak Special. She is also a Grammy Award nominee.

Early life
Crouse was born in New York City, the daughter of Anna (née Erskine) and Russel Crouse, a playwright. Her maternal grandparents were author and educator John Erskine and his wife Pauline Ives. Lindsay Ann Crouse's full name is an intentional tribute to the Broadway writing partnership of Lindsay and Crouse, which consisted of her father and his writing partner, Howard Lindsay. The two wrote much of The Sound of Music. Their 1946 play State of the Union won that year's Pulitzer Prize for Drama. Their last collaboration was Mr. President in 1962. As Crouse has said: "In our family, the work ethic was held up as some kind of byword ... At any hour, somebody's typewriter was going."

Career
After graduating from the Chapin School in 1966 
and Radcliffe College in 1970, Crouse began her performing career as a modern and jazz dancer, but she soon switched to acting and made her Broadway debut in Much Ado About Nothing in 1972. She received her acting training at HB Studio in New York City. 

Crouse's film career began in 1976, with small roles in television and theatrical movies.  In 1977, she appeared as Lily Braden, the discontented wife of hockey player Ned Braden in Slap Shot. In 1982 she appeared as the decisive witness in The Verdict. Crouse was nominated for an Academy Award for Best Supporting Actress for her role in the 1984 movie Places in the Heart.  Among her films was a starring role in House of Games, the 1987 film directed and written by her then-husband David Mamet, in which she plays Margaret Ford, a psychiatrist who is intrigued by the art of the con. "It's always hard to be directed by someone who's close to you," Crouse says. "Because everybody needs to go home and complain about the director. Everybody."

Crouse has appeared in featured and guest roles in a number of television series.  Notable roles include a recurring portrayal of Kate McBride, a lesbian police officer on Hill Street Blues during its sixth season in 1986. This was the first lesbian recurring character on a major network.  Crouse is also known for her role in the fourth season of Buffy the Vampire Slayer, where she was a recurring supporting cast member playing Professor Maggie Walsh.  Crouse has also guest-starred on Alias, CSI: Crime Scene Investigation, Columbo, Criminal Minds, Law & Order, ER, Millennium, and NYPD Blue.

In recent years, Crouse has concentrated on the theater. "Once you get your driver's license, you end your film career," says Crouse. "Look at my generation. Great actresses like Glenn Close and Susan Sarandon—there's nothing written for anyone over a certain age." In 2007, Crouse opened a revival of The Belle of Amherst, a one-woman show about the life of poet Emily Dickinson, at the Gloucester Stage in Gloucester, Massachusetts. "You can't stop and recite something," says Crouse. "You have to keep the poetry very, very active, which is pretty easy with Dickinson. She was striving so hard to understand what life was about. It's very dramatic poetry in that way.

Crouse appeared in Lee Blessing's Going to St. Ives with the Gloucester Stage Company during the summer of 2008 and provided the narration for Virginia Lee Burton: A Sense of Place, a documentary film about Virginia Lee Burton.  In 2021, she appeared in a limited engagement of Mornings at Seven at Broadway's Theatre at St. Clements.

Personal life
After a relationship with Robert Duvall, Crouse married playwright David Mamet in 1977. The two had met during the production on Slap Shot. John Lahr writes in his book Show and Tell: New Yorker Profiles that when Mamet married Crouse in 1977, he "married into show business aristocracy". Lahr also writes that Mamet got his first screenwriting assignment through Crouse. Crouse was on her way to audition for Bob Rafelson's 1981 remake of The Postman Always Rings Twice, and jokingly Mamet told Crouse to tell Rafelson that "he was a fool if he didn't hire me to write the screenplay." But Crouse said this to Rafelson, who called Mamet; when the director asked why he should hire him for the screenplay, Mamet replied, "Because I'll give you a good screenplay or a sincere apology." Mamet got the job. She and Mamet divorced in 1990. Their marriage produced two daughters, Willa and Zosia Mamet.

Crouse's brother is Timothy Crouse, author of The Boys on the Bus about political journalism during the 1972 presidential campaign.

Buddhist beliefs

Crouse is a Buddhist. In 2005, she organized an annual Buddhist educational program, originally held at the Windhover Center for the Performing Arts in Rockport, Massachusetts, and then in 2010 moved to The Governor's Academy in Byfield, Massachusetts.   Crouse has spoken on the relevance of Buddhism in the modern world:

Filmography

Film

Television

References

External links
 
 Lindsay Crouse brings third annual Buddhist retreat to Rockport
 Lindsay Crouse Summer Retreat in Massachusetts web site
 Lindsay Crouse web site
 Lindsay Crouse's Buddhist Teachings posted online at ACI-LA
 Lindsay Crouse's additional Buddhist teachings posted online

Actresses from New York City
American Buddhists
American film actresses
American television actresses
Living people
Radcliffe College alumni
20th-century American actresses
21st-century American actresses
American stage actresses
Chapin School (Manhattan) alumni
Vajrayana Buddhists
Year of birth missing (living people)